Dana Complex is a building complex in Satu Mare, Romania. The structure has two separate buildings linked together by a skybridge.

References

Buildings and structures in Satu Mare
History of Satu Mare
Buildings and structures completed in 2011